Joseph Shortlidge (August 1, 1832 – December 10, 1911) was the sixth president of the Pennsylvania State University, serving from July 1880 until April 1881.

References

 Penn State Presidents and their achievements

1832 births
1911 deaths
Presidents of Pennsylvania State University